The Caribbean flagfin blenny (Emblemariopsis carib) is a species of chaenopsid blenny known from tropical reefs in Puerto Rico and the Virgin Islands, in the Caribbean Sea. This species reaches a length of  SL.

Etymology 
The species epithet refers to the Carib people of the Antilles.

References
 Victor, B.C., 2010. Emblemariopsis carib and Emblemariopsis arawak, two new chaenopsid blennies from the Caribbean Sea: DNA barcoding identifies males, females, and juveniles and distinguishes sympatric cryptic species. Journal of the Ocean Science Foundation 4:1-30.

carib
Fish described in 2010